Danan may refer to:

Places
 Danan (volcano), one of the three volcanic cones of the island of Krakatoa
 Danan (Amran), sub-district located in Al Ashah District, 'Amran Governorate, Yemen
 Danan (woreda), a district in eastern Ethiopia
 Danan, Ethiopia, the town the district in Ethiopia is named for
 Dânan, small town in Djibouti
 Danan, Iran, a village in Kurdistan Province, Iran

People
Danan Hughes (born 1970), American football wide receiver
Danan Henry (born 1939), American Roshi in the Harada-Yasutani lineage
Elora Danan, fictional character introduced in the 1988 fantasy film Willow
Paul Danan (born 1978), English actor
Saadia Ibn Danan (died c. 1493), grammarian of Hebrew and Arabic and poet

Other
Danan: The Jungle Fighter, 1990 Sega Master System action/platform-adventure game in Brazil and Europe

See also
 Danaan
 Danann
 Danann (disambiguation)